Millington Jr./Sr. High School is a combined public junior/senior high school located in Millington, Michigan, United States in south western Tuscola County. It is part of the Millington Community Schools system and is a member of the Tri-Valley West Athletic Conference.

Academics
Millington High School is accredited by the North Central Association.  Advanced Placement courses are offered in biology, statistics, U.S. and world history and English literature.  Additional AP courses are available online through Michigan Virtual High School.  College credit can be obtained through Cardinal College in association with Mott Community College.

Athletics
Millington is a member of the Tri-Valley West Athletic Conference, which is a member of the Michigan High School Athletic Association.

Millington participates in the following sports:

American football
Baseball
Basketball
Cheerleading
Cross country
Golf
Powerlifting
Soccer
Softball
Track and field
Volleyball
Wrestling

Notable alumni
Danny Schell, former Major League Baseball player for Philadelphia Phillies

References

External links
Millington Community Schools Official Website
Millington Football Stats

Public high schools in Michigan
Schools in Tuscola County, Michigan